My Name Is Bill W. is a 1989 CBS Hallmark Hall of Fame made-for-television drama film directed by Daniel Petrie, starring James Woods, JoBeth Williams and James Garner. William G. Borchert, who wrote the film script for television, based it on the true story of William Griffith Wilson and Robert Holbrook Smith (the men respectively called "Bill W." and "Dr. Bob"), the co-founders of Alcoholics Anonymous. James Woods won an Emmy for his portrayal of Wilson.

Plot
The movie details the true story of stockbroker William Griffith Wilson, a World War I veteran whose drinking problem becomes a serious addiction and causes him to lose his fortune in the stock market collapse of 1929. Wilson's career and his domestic life are in tatters when he meets Robert Holbrook Smith, also struggling with a drinking problem. The duo founded a support group that became the nucleus for the society Alcoholics Anonymous.

Featured cast

Awards and nominations

1990 American Cinema Editors Awards (Eddies)
Nominated – Best Edited Television Special: Paul Rubell, John Wright

1990 American Society of Cinematographers
Nominated – Outstanding Achievement in Cinematography in Movies of the Week/Pilots: Neil Roach

1990 Directors Guild of America
Nominated – Outstanding Directorial Achievement in Dramatic Specials: Daniel Petrie

1989 Emmy Awards
Won – Outstanding Lead Actor In A Miniseries Or A Movie: James Woods
Nominated – Outstanding Costumes For A Miniseries, Movie Or A Special: April Ferry
Nominated – Outstanding Directing For A Miniseries, Movie Or A Dramatic Special: Daniel Petrie
Nominated – Outstanding Made For Television Movie: Peter K. Duchow, James Garner, Daniel Petrie
Nominated – Outstanding Single-Camera Picture Editing For A Miniseries Or A Movie: Paul Rubell, John Wright
Nominated – Outstanding Supporting Actor In A Miniseries Or A Movie: James Garner
Nominated – Outstanding Writing For A Miniseries, Movie Or A Dramatic Special: William G. Borchert

1990 Golden Globe Awards
Nominated – Best Mini-Series or Motion Picture Made for Television
Nominated – Best Actor - Mini-Series or Motion Picture Made for Television: James Woods

See also
 History of Alcoholics Anonymous

External links

Bill's Story, from Alcoholics Anonymous Big Book

1989 television films
1989 films
1980s biographical drama films
Alcoholics Anonymous
American biographical drama films
CBS network films
Films about alcoholism
Films directed by Daniel Petrie
Hallmark Hall of Fame episodes
Films scored by Laurence Rosenthal
American drama television films
1980s American films